Aurélien Ngeyitala Lola (born 29 May 1994) is a professional footballer who plays as a midfielder for Championnat National 3 club . Born in France, he is a former DR Congo youth international.

Club career
Ngeyitala was born in Évry, France. In March 2019, he moved to Vereya.

References

External links
 
 
 Zonaburgas.bg

1994 births
Living people
Association football midfielders
Democratic Republic of the Congo footballers
Democratic Republic of the Congo expatriate footballers
FC Sochaux-Montbéliard players
PFC Chernomorets Burgas players
Évry FC players
ŠK Senec players
FC Nitra players
FC Arsenal Kyiv players
FC Vereya players
ESA Linas-Montlhéry players
2. Liga (Slovakia) players
Slovak Super Liga players
First Professional Football League (Bulgaria) players
Ukrainian Premier League players
Championnat National 3 players
Expatriate footballers in Bulgaria
Democratic Republic of the Congo expatriate sportspeople in Bulgaria
Expatriate footballers in Slovakia
Democratic Republic of the Congo expatriate sportspeople in Slovakia
Expatriate footballers in Ukraine
Democratic Republic of the Congo expatriate sportspeople in Ukraine
21st-century Democratic Republic of the Congo people
French footballers
French sportspeople of Democratic Republic of the Congo descent
French expatriate footballers
French expatriate sportspeople in Ukraine
French expatriate sportspeople in Bulgaria
French expatriate sportspeople in Slovakia
Black French sportspeople